The Israel Southwick House is an historic house located at 76 Mendon Street (at its northwest corner with Oak Street), in Uxbridge, Massachusetts.  The  story wood-frame house was built c. 1860–65, and is a good local example of Italianate styling, with Queen Anne elements added c. 1890.  The main facade is three bays, with a center entry that has an elaborate colonnaded porch with a gable front roof.  Above the entry is a Palladian window with a small half-round window surmounting the central of three relatively narrow windows.  There is a gable-roof dormer with three windows above.  To the left of the entry is a single story porch that has been enclosed, and a rounded corner porch extends to the right of the entry.

On October 7, 1983, it was added to the National Register of Historic Places, where it is listed at 70 Mendon Street.

See also
National Register of Historic Places listings in Uxbridge, Massachusetts

References

External links
 Israel Southwick House MACRIS Listing

Houses in Uxbridge, Massachusetts
National Register of Historic Places in Uxbridge, Massachusetts
Houses on the National Register of Historic Places in Worcester County, Massachusetts
Queen Anne architecture in Massachusetts
Italianate architecture in Massachusetts